
Gmina Widuchowa is a rural gmina (administrative district) in Gryfino County, West Pomeranian Voivodeship, in north-western Poland, on the German border.

The gmina contains parts of the protected areas of Cedynia Landscape Park and Lower Odra Valley Landscape Park.

Villages
Gmina Widuchowa contains the villages and settlements of Bolkowice, Czarnówko, Dębogóra, Kiełbice, Kłodowo, Krzywin, Krzywinek, Lubicz, Lubiczyn, Marwice, Ognica, Pacholęta, Pąkowo, Polesiny, Radoszki, Rynica, Tarnogórki, Widuchowa, Widuchówko, Wilcze, Żarczyn and Żelechowo.

Neighbouring gminas
Gmina Widuchowa is bordered by the gminas of Banie, Chojna and Gryfino. It also borders Germany.

References
Polish official population figures 2006

Widuchowa
Gryfino County